Mississippi flag referendum may refer to one of two referendums to change the flag of Mississippi.

2001 Mississippi flag referendum, unsuccessful
2020 Mississippi flag referendum, successful